

322001–322100 

|-bgcolor=#f2f2f2
| colspan=4 align=center | 
|}

322101–322200 

|-bgcolor=#f2f2f2
| colspan=4 align=center | 
|}

322201–322300 

|-bgcolor=#f2f2f2
| colspan=4 align=center | 
|}

322301–322400 

|-id=390
| 322390 Planes de Son ||  || Les Planes de Son, a 1500-meter high plateau in the Catalan Pyrenees, Spain || 
|}

322401–322500 

|-bgcolor=#f2f2f2
| colspan=4 align=center | 
|}

322501–322600 

|-id=510
| 322510 Heinrichgrüber ||  || Heinrich Grüber (1891–1975), German theologian in Berlin. || 
|-id=574
| 322574 Werckmeister ||  || Andreas Werckmeister (1645–1706), an organist and a music theorist. || 
|-id=577
| 322577 Stephanhellmich ||  || Stephan Hellmich (born 1981), a German planetary scientist, computer scientist, and discoverer of minor planets, whose thesis was about the influence of the Yarkovsky effect on the long-term stability of Jupiter trojans. || 
|}

322601–322700 

|-bgcolor=#f2f2f2
| colspan=4 align=center | 
|}

322701–322800 

|-bgcolor=#f2f2f2
| colspan=4 align=center | 
|}

322801–322900 

|-bgcolor=#f2f2f2
| colspan=4 align=center | 
|}

322901–323000 

|-id=912
| 322912 Jedlik ||  || Ányos Jedlik (1800–1895), a Hungarian inventor, engineer, physicist and Benedictine priest. || 
|}

References 

322001-323000